Junk Science is the first studio album by electronic music duo Deep Dish. The album reached number 37 in the United Kingdom.

Track listing
All tracks by Dubfire and Sharam, except where noted.

CD album
"Morning Wood" – 2:19
"The Future of the Future (Stay Gold)" featuring Tracey Thorn (Dubfire, Sharam, Ben Watt) – 9:28
"Summer's Over" – 7:16
"Mohammad Is Jesus..." (Dubfire, Morel, Sharam) – 4:47
"Stranded" – 7:10
"Junk Science" – 3:51
"Sushi" – 7:52
"My Only Sin" (Dubfire, Morel, Sharam) – 4:05
"Monsoon" – 6:52
"Persepolis" – 2:55
"Chocolate City (Love Songs)" – 10:28
"Mohammad Is Jesus..." (In Dub) – 5:16
"Wear the Hat" – 5:29

Vinyl album
"The Future of the Future (Stay Gold)" featuring Tracey Thorn (Dubfire, Sharam, Watt) – 13:20
"Summer's Over" – 8:41
"Wear the Hat" – 5:29
"Stranded" – 7:53
"Junk Science" – 5:58
"Sushi" – 7:50
"My Only Sin" (Dubfire, Morel, Sharam) – 4:04
"Morning Wood" – 2:19
"Chocolate City (Love Songs)" – 10:28
"Mohammad Is Jesus" (In Dub) – 5:14
"Mohammad Is Jesus" (Dubfire, Morel, Sharam) – 4:46
"Monsoon" – 6:52
"Persepolis" – 2:55

Vinyl 2×12" promo
"Mohammad Is Jesus" (Dubfire, Morel, Sharam) – 9:16
"Sushi" – 9:47
"The Future of the Future (Stay Gold)" (Dubfire, Sharam, Watt) – 13:20
"Chocolate City (Love Songs)" – 10:28

Charts

References

1998 debut albums
Deep Dish (band) albums